Jase & Lauren is an Australian breakfast radio show hosted by Jason Hawkins and Lauren Phillips on KIIS 1011 in Melbourne. The show is also syndicated in the night-time slot on the KIIS Network following The Kyle and Jackie O Show. A daily podcast of the morning's show is also produced.

History 
In July 2021, Australian Radio Network announced that Lauren Phillips would join co-host Jason 'Jase' Hawkins from 9 August 2021 on the KIIS 101.1 breakfast program. Hawkins had previously co-hosted with Polly 'PJ' Harding on the breakfast program Jase & PJ. Following the departure of Harding on July 23 2021, the show was relaunched with Lauren Phillips.

On 30 July 2021, a one-hour popup show was heard on the air a week before the official launch. Jase and Lauren introduced new friends of the show. Clint Stanaway replaces Sacha Barbour Gatt as the shows newsreader, Christian Petracca will provide weekly contributions.

In December 2022, Alice James was announced as new executive producer of the program, replacing Luke James.

Segments 

 Tradie Trivia: Each morning, Jase & Lauren will pit the two players from different professions against each other when they challenge them to answer five general knowledge questions.
 $5K Word Play: A word association game. The caller selects Jase, Lauren or Clint to play. If Jase, Lauren or Clint match 5 words specified by the caller from a range of topics the caller wins $5,000.
 Unpopular Opinions: Each Friday, Jase, Lauren and Clint share their unpopular opinion.
 Two Bob's Worth with Bobby Phillips: Each Friday Lauren's dad, Bobby Phillips recaps the week that's been.

Team members

Current team members 
Jase and Lauren have two content producers, two audio producers and a digital producer.

Past team members

References

External links 

 Jase & Lauren
 KIIS 101.1

Australian radio programs
2020s Australian radio programs